The Paringa Bridge carries the Sturt Highway across the Murray River in Paringa, South Australia. Until 1982, it also carried the Barmera railway line.

It was designed by the South Australian Railways (SAR) and fabricated by Perry Engineering of Adelaide. It opened on 31 January 1927. It was built as a road-rail bridge with both the Sturt Highway and Barmera railway lines using the same reservation. Maintenance cost were shared equally between the SAR and Highways department.

Subsequently, road lanes were added on either side to segregate the road and rail traffic. The last train crossed the bridge on 21 May 1982 with the line beyond Renmark formally closed on 7 March 1984. The railway tracks were removed in 1986 and the centre reservation converted to a shared pedestrian and cycle path.

The vertical-lift span is opened twice a day for river traffic.

The bridge was listed as a State Heritage Place on the South Australian Heritage Register on 29 June 1989.

References

External links

Bridges completed in 1927
Crossings of the Murray River
Road-rail bridges
South Australian Heritage Register
Vertical lift bridges in Australia
1927 establishments in Australia
Road bridges in South Australia